The Kate Gleason College of Engineering (KGCOE) is the engineering college at the Rochester Institute of Technology. The college is home to all of RIT's engineering programs except for software engineering, which is part of the B. Thomas Golisano College of Computing and Information Sciences. Enrollment for the 2014-15 academic year, per the 21 Day Report: 2,742 undergraduate students, 714 graduate students, 22.01% female. 100% of tenured and tenure-track faculty hold doctoral degrees.

History 
In 1885, the Rochester Mechanics' Institutes was founded as a school for fostering technical development in the Rochester area. In 1891, the Mechanics Institute merged with the Rochester Athenaeum, forming the Rochester Athenaeum and Mechanics Institute, in order to provide more comprehensive education for both of the student bodies. In 1944, the university adopted its current name of Rochester Institute of Technology. At this point, the RIT campus was still in downtown Rochester, and the College of Engineering was still in the original Mechanics Institute buildings. In 1968, the RIT moved to a combined campus in Henrietta, New York. The College remains there today and is housed at the James E. Gleason Building and the Center for Microelectronic Engineering.

In 1998, the College of Engineering was renamed the Kate Gleason College of Engineering, the only engineering college in the United States to be named after a woman.

Programs 
The college includes the following departments and programs: Biomedical Engineering, Chemical Engineering, Computer Engineering, Electrical Engineering, Industrial & Systems Engineering, Mechanical Engineering, Microelectronic Engineering, Microsystems Engineering, Center for Quality and Applied Statistics, Manufacturing Leadership, and Product Development

Academics 
All seven of KGCOE's bachelor's degree programs are ABET (Accreditation Board of Engineering and Technology) accredited, which is a prerequisite for licensure as a professional engineer in many states. In their final semester of study, graduating seniors in ABET approved majors are eligible to sit for the NCEES Fundamentals of Engineering (FE) section of the New York State Professional Engineering examination, which is the first step in the process for licensure as a Professional Engineer (PE).

Students may choose to focus their upper-level studies on a particular field of interest such as robotics, energy, supply chain, manufacturing, sustainability, automotive, aerospace, wireless communication, digital devices, biomaterials, ergonomics, systems, embedded systems, networks and security, Lean Six Sigma.

The college offers the following degrees: Bachelor of Science, Master of Science, Master of Engineering and Doctor of Philosophy. Advanced certificates in Vibrations and Lean Six Sigma are also offered. Undergraduate certificates are also offered in mechatronics and integrated circuits.

Organizations and clubs 
The college also hosts many engineering student organizations and clubs, such as:
Aero Design Club
American Institute of Chemical Engineers
American Society of Mechanical Engineers
Biomedical Engineering Club
Baja SAE Team
Engineering House
Engineers for a Sustainable World
Electric Vehicle Team
FIRST Robotics Team
Formula SAE Team
Hot Wheelz Formula SAE Electric Team
Multidisciplinary Robotics Club
Institute of Electrical and Electronics Engineers
Institute of Industrial Engineers
 Microelectronic Engineering Student Association
National Society of Black Engineers
Pi Tau Sigma (National Mechanical Engineering Honor Society)
Society of Hispanic Professional Engineers
Society of Manufacturing Engineers
Society of Women Engineers
 Tau Beta Pi
IEEE Computer Society Student Chapter

References

External links 

Engineering universities and colleges in New York (state)
Engineering schools and colleges in the United States
Rochester Institute of Technology colleges
1971 establishments in New York (state)